
Gmina Stara Kornica is a rural gmina (administrative district) in Łosice County, Masovian Voivodeship, in east-central Poland. Its seat is the village of Stara Kornica, which lies approximately 15 kilometres (9 mi) south-east of Łosice and 131 km (81 mi) east of Warsaw.

Villages
Gmina Stara Kornica contains the villages and settlements of Czeberaki, Dubicze, Kazimierzów, Kiełbaski, Kobylany, Kornica Kolonia, Koszelówka, Nowa Kornica, Nowe Szpaki, Popławy, Rudka, Stara Kornica, Stare Szpaki, Szpaki-Kolonia, Walim, Walimek, Wólka Nosowska, Wygnanki, Wyrzyki and Zalesie.

Neighbouring gminas
Gmina Stara Kornica is bordered by the gminas of Huszlew, Konstantynów, Leśna Podlaska, Łosice, Platerów and Sarnaki.

References

Polish official population figures 2006

Stara Kornica
Łosice County